Antonio Duval Brown (born March 3, 1978) is a former American football wide receiver who played for the Buffalo Bills and Washington Redskins of the National Football League (NFL). He played college football at West Virginia University.

References

1978 births
Living people
American football wide receivers
Buffalo Bills players
Players of American football from Miami
Washington Redskins players
West Virginia Mountaineers football players